M3UA is a communication protocol of the SIGTRAN family, used in telephone networks to carry signaling over Internet Protocol (IP).  M3UA enables the SS7 protocol's User Parts (e.g. ISUP, SCCP and TUP) to run over virtually any network technology breaking its limitation to telephony equipment like T-carrier, E-carrier or Asynchronous Transfer Mode (ATM), which highly improves scalability of the signaling networks.

Like other adaptation protocols, M3UA uses SCTP to transmit messages between its network elements.

Implementation scheme

Typical scheme 
                   _                __ 
|      |                   |       |                |     MGC|
|  SP  |<----------------->|  SGW  |<---------------|-->(AS) |
|__|   SS7 network     |___|   IP network   ||
  MTP3
point-code                         common point-code
   PC1                                    PC2

Use SGW as STP
Several AS owns PC itself and uses SGW as STP (transit pointcode).
                 _               ___ 
|      |                 |    SGW    |               |      MGC|
|      |                 |           | /-------------|-->(AS)  | point-code PC3
|  SP  |<----------------|-->(STP)<--|-              |         |
|      |                 |           | \-------------|-->(AS)  | point-code PC4
|__|  SS7 network    |___|   IP network  |_|
  MTP3                    point-code
point-code                   PC2                         
   PC1

Protocol 
M3UA uses a complex state machine to manage and indicate states it's running. Several M3UA messages are mandatory to make an M3UA association or peering fully functional (ASP UP, ASP UP Acknowledge, ASP Active, ASP Active Acknowledge), some others are recommended (Notify, Destination Audits (DAUD)).

Additional info 

An open implementation of the M3UA standard can be found at OpenSS7's web site.

Wireshark is shipped with a dissector for M3UA, sample packets can be found in Wireshark's wiki page, which shows ISUP Packet samples (including M3UA).

References

Internet protocols
Internet Standards
Signaling System 7